Movit Products Ltd is a Ugandan personal care company based in Kampala, manufacturing personal care products. Its brands include Movit, Radiant, Baby Junior, Skin Guard, Pine and NAN. The company was founded in 1997, by Simpson Birungi as a makeshift workshop in Namasuba, Wakiso District. In 1999 the first Movit product, Herbal Baby Jelly, was put on the market. Over the years, Movit, the company’s flagship name, has grown into one of Uganda’s top cosmetics brands with distribution links in both East Africa and the COMESA regions. Other known products from Movit include the Body Milk Lotion, Junior Petroleum Jelly, Movit No base Relaxer and many more.

See also 

 Adore Beauty
 Body Organics
 SimplySiti

References

External links
 Official website

Manufacturing companies of Uganda
Companies established in 1997
Cosmetics companies of Uganda
Companies based in Kampala